Aaron Brian Gunches (born June 30, 1971) is an American prisoner currently on death row at Arizona State Prison in Florence, Arizona, after being convicted for the 2002 murder of Ted Price. He is scheduled to be executed on April 6, 2023.

Crimes
In December 2002, Gunches went to his girlfriend's home in Mesa, Arizona. Upon arrival, he discovered that she had been involved in an altercation with her ex-husband, Ted Price, who had come to visit her earlier that day. Price had been struck in the face with a telephone and lay on the floor in a daze. Gunches then had his girlfriend and her roommates help load Price into his car, with the supposed intention to drop him off at a bus station. However, Gunches soon realized he did not have the money to buy Price a bus ticket. Gunches and an acquaintance then drove Price out into the desert off the Beeline Highway. As Price exited the car, Gunches shot him four times, killing him.

On January 15, 2003, Arizona Department of Public Safety Officer Robert Flannery pulled over Gunches in his car during a routine traffic stop. Gunches then fired at Flannery and shot him twice. He then fled the scene. Flannery was injured in the shooting but survived. After the shooting, a manhunt involving over fifty lawmen began. Gunches was arrested the day after the shooting and was found hiding in a haystack in Wenden. He was taken into custody and was charged with two counts of attempted second-degree murder.

Trial
In 2004, Gunches pled guilty to the murder of Ted Price. In 2008, Gunches was sentenced to death.

Scheduled execution
In November 2022, Gunches represented himself and asked the Arizona Supreme Court to issue his execution warrant so that justice could be served and the victims could get closure. Arizona Attorney General Mark Brnovich asked the Arizona Supreme Court to issue a warrant for Gunches' execution. In January 2023, Gunches withdrew his request, saying recent executions were "torture." Attorney General Kris Mayes took office and on January 20, 2023, newly elected Governor of Arizona Katie Hobbs ordered a review of the state's death penalty protocols. Mayes attempted to withdraw Brnovich's request for the warrant, but on March 2, 2023, the court issued the warrant for April 6, 2023, stating that it must issue the warrant after certain appellate proceedings were concluded. Following the issuance, Governor Hobbs stated that the warrant authorized the execution of Gunches but did not require the state to carry out the execution. Karen Price, Ted Price's sister, then submitted a petition for special action asking the Arizona Supreme Court to direct Hobbs to carry out the warrant. Maricopa County Attorney Rachel Mitchell filed an amicus curiae brief supporting Karen Price's petition. Hobbs filed a motion stating the court should not consider Karen Price's motion because the state is not prepared to carry out an execution in a constitutionally sound manner and lacks correctional staff with proper expertise. Arizona Department of Corrections Director Ryan Thornell said he was "unable to find enough documentation to understand key elements of the execution process and instead has had to piece information together through conversations with employees present at past executions."

See also
 Capital punishment in Arizona
 List of death row inmates in the United States
 List of people scheduled to be executed in the United States

References

1971 births
2002 in Arizona
Living people
People convicted of murder by Arizona
Place of birth missing (living people)
Prisoners sentenced to death by Arizona